Pennsylvania Route 531 (PA 531) is a state highway located entirely in Erie County, Pennsylvania. Its northern terminus is located at U.S. Route 20 (US 20) in Harborcreek Township. Its southern terminus is at Pennsylvania Route 430, also in Harborcreek Township.

Route description

PA 531 begins at an intersection with PA 430 in Harborcreek Township, heading north on two-lane undivided Depot Road. The road passes through a mix of farmland and woodland before it reaches an interchange with Interstate 90 (I-90). After this interchange, the route turns to the northwest at a truck stop and continues past woods to the northeast and residential subdivisions to the southwest. PA 531 curves north again as it passes a couple farms before heading northwest near rural areas of homes. The route reaches its northern terminus at an intersection with US 20 next to Harbor Creek Jr./Sr. High School.

Major intersections

See also

References

External links

Pennsylvania Highways: PA 531

531
Transportation in Erie County, Pennsylvania